Buca Gölet (literally Buca Pond) is an artificial lake and a recreation center on the lake in İzmir, Turkey.
Some of the facilities are an amphitheatre, play ground for children, livestock paddock, sea food and fast food restaurants, coffee houses,  picnic areas and observation terraces.

References 

Parks in İzmir
Aegean Region
Bucak District